5 o'clock or five o'clock may refer to:
 "5 O'Clock" (T-Pain song), 2011 R&B/hip-hop song by T-Pain
 "5 O'Clock" (Nonchalant song), 1996 hip-hop song by Nonchalant
 5th hour of a clock, see 12-hour clock
 The end of a 9-to-5 workday, see Working time
 The 5 O'Clock Show, 2010 UK Channel 4 TV talk show
 Richard Hammond's 5 O'Clock Show, 2006 UK ITV TV talk show
 It's Five O'Clock, 1969 album by Aphrodite's Child
 "It's Five O'Clock" (song), a song by Aphrodite's Child from the 1969 album It's Five O'Clock
 It's Five O'Clock Somewhere, 2003 country song by Alan Jackson and Jimmy Buffett

See also 
 5 o'clock shadow
 5 o'clock wave
 5 A.M. (disambiguation)

Date and time disambiguation pages